Heymans is a surname. Notable people with the surname include:

 Adriaan Jozef Heymans, Belgian painter
 Cédric Heymans, French rugby player
 Corneille Heymans (1892-1968), Belgian physiologist
 Heymans (crater), a lunar impact crater, named after him
 Émilie Heymans, Canadian diver (born in Belgium)
 Gerardus Heymans (1857-1930), Dutch philosopher & psychologist
 Jonas Heymans, Belgian footballer
 Margriet Heymans, Dutch writer and illustrator of children's literature
 Mau Heymans, Dutch artist and writer, known for his work on Disney comics

See also
 Chayyim, the basis for this name
 Heyman
 Hijmans

Surnames of Dutch origin
Surnames of Belgian origin
Patronymic surnames